Stein Bugge (26 September 1896 – 3 October 1961) was a Norwegian playwright, theatre theorist and theatre director. He was theatre director of the Bergen theatre Den Nationale Scene from 1946 to 1948.

Selected works
Det ideale teater (1928)
Tragedien om Mengin (play, 1928)

References

1896 births
1961 deaths
Theatre people from Bergen
Norwegian theatre directors
20th-century Norwegian dramatists and playwrights
Norwegian male dramatists and playwrights